Chu Eun-ju (born January 20, 1979), known by her stage name Choo Ja-hyun, is a South Korean actress. Best known in Korea for the films Bloody Tie (2006) and Portrait of a Beauty (2008), Choo has also actively worked in China since 2007, notably in television drama The Temptation to Go Home (2011, remake of Temptation of Wife).

Early life
Chu Eun-ju was born and raised in Daegu, the then-capital of North Gyeongsang Province. The only daughter of a cosmetologist and a white-collar worker, her parents divorced when she was 18 years old. She also revealed on a Chinese TV show that she had a little sister who died by drowning when they were younger. Choo graduated from Dankook University, with a bachelor's degree in Theater and Film.

Career

South Korea
Using the stage name Choo Ja-hyun, she began her entertainment career as a model at age 17. She made her acting debut in 1996, and went on to appear in several television series, among them Successful Story of a Bright Girl (2002), Sunrise House (2002), and Apgujeong House (2003).

Then after a decade in relative obscurity, Choo drew critical acclaim in 2006 for her portrayal of a ravaged drug addict in Bloody Tie, a film noir about the meth trade in 1990s Busan. She won acting recognition from the Grand Bell Awards, the Korean Film Awards, and the Director's Cut Awards, as well as nominations from the Blue Dragon Film Awards and the Baeksang Arts Awards.

She was then cast in the erotic period drama Portrait of a Beauty, based on Lee Jung-myung's novel Painter of the Wind which reimagined Joseon artist Shin Yun-bok as a woman disguised as a man. Portrait of a Beauty became the 8th best-selling Korean film of 2008, and Choo again received supporting actress nominations for playing a gisaeng who entertains noblemen by performing dances and poetry readings.

This was followed by Missing (2009), a slasher film in which Choo's character is determined to find her younger sister, who's been abducted by a psychopath farmer who rapes and murders young women.

She starred in Loveholic in 2010, a character-driven romance drama directed by Kwon Chil-in. Choo played a self-destructive woman with a drinking problem and professional crises; she goes to stay at her friend's house until she sorts out her life, then has an affair with the latter's cuckolded husband.

Choo next appeared in The Famished, a 27-minute short film about stage actors who eat their own memories to satisfy their hunger; it was included in the omnibus Short! Short! Short! 2010: Fantastic Theater.

Taiwan and China
Choo had begun building her pan-Asian profile when she appeared in the 2003 Taiwanese drama Scent of Love, which ranked number one in the ratings when it aired in Taiwan.

Despite almost a decade of acting experience in her homeland, Choo later said she decided to launch her career in China for practical reasons, "I did not have a choice (but to debut in China). Acting is my trade, and I have to act to make a living, but in Korea the work was not steady enough for a stable income." She was cast as Du Chun's leading lady in The Legend of the Banner Hero (also known as Clan Feuds), adapted from Taiwanese novelist Gu Long's wuxia novel of the same title. It was filmed in 2005, and aired in 2007. In late 2007, Choo was part of the main cast of another Gu Long adaptation, The Legend of Chu Liuxiang.

But it was her leading role as a betrayed wife in revenge melodrama The Temptation to Go Home (also known as Temptation of Going Home or Lure of Homecoming), a 2011 remake of Korea's Temptation of Wife (the original and remake both received high ratings), that catapulted Choo into stardom in Mainland China and made her one of the most sought-after Hallyu stars there. Fluent in Chinese and English, Choo has since relocated to Beijing and concentrated on her acting career in China, with occasional forays in Korean cinema. Her name is rendered in Chinese as Qiu Cixuan.

When Choo appeared in a semi-nude hanbok photo shoot for a Chinese magazine in 2011, she was criticized by Korean netizens for "damaging the national costume's image." Because of the controversy, she closed down her Twitter account and is instead active on the Chinese microblogging platform Weibo. Choo's old nude photos were also leaked to Chinese websites that year; her Chinese agency said the photos had been taken for personal reasons and threatened legal action against those circulating them.

She continued playing lead roles in Chinese television dramas of various genres (epic, fantasy, period drama, contemporary romance), such as Wipe Out the Bandits of Wulong Mountain (2012), Turbulence of the Mu Clan (2012), Hu Xian (2013), Legend of Southwest Dance and Music (2013), Xiu Xiu's Men (2014), and Gorgeous Workers (2014).

Personal life
Choo announced on November 30, 2016 that she would be marrying Chinese actor and singer Yu Xiaoguang in 2017.
Her management agency said that the families of the two recently met and discussed how to prepare for the wedding.
The actress first revealed their romantic relationship through Chinese social media site Weibo in September 2015. They first met while appearing in a Chinese drama in 2012. They married on January 18, 2017.

On June 1, 2018, Chu Ja-hyun gave birth to a boy at a hospital in Seoul, South Korea.

Filmography

Film

Korean television

Chinese television

Awards and nominations

References

External links
 
Choo Ja-hyun Fan Cafe at Daum 

1979 births
People from Daegu
Living people
South Korean television actresses
South Korean film actresses
Dankook University alumni
Jeonju Chu clan